Ervin may refer to:

Ervin (given name)
Ervin (surname)
Ervin Township, Howard County, Indiana, one of eleven townships in Howard County, Indiana, USA

See also
 Justice Ervin (disambiguation)
 Earvin
 Ervine
 Erving (disambiguation)
 Erwan
 Erwin (disambiguation)
 Irvin
 Irvine
 Irving (disambiguation)
 Irwin (disambiguation)